Blaž Kavčič was the defending champion but chose not to defend his title.

Jason Kubler won the title after defeating Lucas Miedler 6–1, 6–1 in the final.

Seeds

Draw

Finals

Top half

Bottom half

References
Main Draw
Qualifying Draw

Winnipeg National Bank Challenger - Men's Singles
2018 Men's Singles